Bert Johnson may refer to:

Bert Johnson (baseball) (1905–1976), American Negro leagues baseball player
Bert Johnson (American football) (1912–1993), American football running back
Bert Johnson (footballer, born 1916) (1916–2009), British footballer and coach
Bert Johnson (Australian footballer) (born 1939), footballer for North Melbourne Football Club
Bert Johnson (Canadian politician) (born 1939), Progressive Conservative member of the Legislative Assembly of Ontario
Bert Johnson (Michigan politician) (born 1973), former Democratic member of the Michigan Senate
 Bertie Williams, later known as  Kevin "Bert" Johnson, co-founder of the Aboriginal Tent Embassy in Canberra, Australia, in 1972

See also
Albert Johnson (disambiguation)
Hubert Johnson (disambiguation)
Herbert Johnson (disambiguation)
Robert Johnson (disambiguation)
Bert Johnston (disambiguation)